William Walker Weightman III (February 4, 1895 – June 13, 1965) was an American bigamist who was the grandson of tycoon William Weightman, one of the richest men in American history. Weightman's arrest, conviction and subsequent suicide attempt were the subject of considerable attention.

When William Weightman died in 1904 leaving a $30 million estate, his heirs launched a legal battle over who would inherit it. Weightman III eventually received $750,000.

In 1925, he was convicted of bigamy and sentenced to two years in prison. 
 
On July 10, 1926, he was sent back to Auburn Prison by a grand jury in Vineland, New Jersey. When his second wife left him he tried to commit suicide with a pistol on November 10, 1926.

References

1895 births
1965 deaths
American people convicted of bigamy